Qualifications for Men's artistic gymnastic competitions at the 2008 Summer Olympics was held at the Beijing National Indoor Stadium on August 9. The results of the qualification determined the qualifiers to the finals: 8 teams in the team final, 24 gymnasts in the all-around final, and 8 gymnasts in each of 6 apparatus finals. The competition was divided to 3 subdivisions. The first subdivision took place at 12:00 China Standard Time (UTC+8); the second and third subdivision took place at 16:00 CST and 20:00 CST respectively.

Qualification results

Overall qualification results

Team qualification

All Around Qualification

Only two gymnasts from each country may advance to the All Around Final. Therefore, in some cases, a third gymnast placed high enough to qualify, but did not advance to the final because of the quota. Gymnasts who did not advance to the Final, but had high enough scores to do so were:
  (6th place)
  (17th place)
  (22nd place)
  (Reserve)

Reserves
The reserves for the All Around Final are
  (29th place)
  (31st place)
  (32nd place)
  (33rd place)

Floor Event Final Qualifiers

Reserves
The reserves for the Floor event final are
  (9th place: 6.700 A, 8.875 B, 15.575 Total)
  (10th place: 6.400 A, 9.150 B, 15.550 Total)
  (11th place: 6.500 A, 9.025 B, 15.525 Total)

Vault Event Final Qualifiers

Reserves
The reserves for the vault event final are
  (6.600 A, 9.750 B)
  (6.600 A, 9.700 B)
  (6.600 A, 9.425 B, 0.100 Penalty)

Parallel Bars Event Final Qualifiers

Horizontal Bar Event Final Qualifiers

Rings Event Final Qualifiers

Pommel Horse Event Final Qualifiers

Subdivision 1

Teams

Individuals

Subdivision 2

Mixed team 4
Róbert Gál 
Filip Ude 
Martin Konecny 
Diego Hypólito

Subdivision 3

Mixed team 5
Mitja Petkovšek 
Valery Goncharov 
Alexander Vorobyev 
Koen van Damme 

Mixed team 1
Sascha Palgen 
Yordan Yovchev 
José Luis Fuentes 
Luis Rivera Rivera 
Sam Simpson

References

Team Qual Results
all Around Qual Results
Floor Qual Results
Vault Qual Results
Parallel Bars Qual Results
Horizontal Bar Qual Results
Rings Qual Results
Pommel Horse Qual Results

Gymnastics at the 2008 Summer Olympics
2008
Men's events at the 2008 Summer Olympics